Proutiella vittula is a moth of the family Notodontidae. It is endemic to the Atlantic coastal forest of Brazil.

References

External links
Species page at Tree of Life project

Endemic fauna of Brazil
Notodontidae of South America
Moths described in 1823